Aleksander Roman "Olek" Balcerowski (born 19 November 2000) is a Polish professional basketball player for Herbalife Gran Canaria of the Liga ACB. Also, he represents Poland national team internationally.

Playing career
Balcerowski started career in Górnik Wałbrzych, Poland. In 2014, he joined Herbalife Gran Canaria at the age of 14 and entered their youth system. Clearly being tall was a factor but in terms of playing ability, Balcerowski had plenty to offer and the Pole worked hard during his time in the youth set-up in Spain to establish himself as one of the standout performers in the youth teams.

Under three years later, Balcerowski became the second youngest player to pull on the vest for the Herbalife Gran Canaria men's team as he made his first team debut at just 17 years and 14 days old. Having participated in the EuroLeague Basketball Adidas Next Generation Tournament Ciutat de L'Hospitalet twice, Balcerowski made his debut in the EuroCup, playing against Tofaş S.K. in December 2017. 

Come the end of the 2020–21 EuroCup Basketball competition, Balcerowski was awarded the EuroCup Basketball Rising Star. He made 65.6 percent of his two-point shots, averaging 6.5 points and 3.7 rebounds in 15 EuroCup games.

During 2020, when playing for Gran Canaria he recorded a career-high 10 rebounds in a game against CB Zamora and a career-best 26 points against CB Villarrobledo.

Following the 2020–21 season Balcerowski declared for the 2021 NBA draft. In July 2021, he was loaned to Mega Basket of the ABA League for the 2021–22 season. On 19 July 2021, he withdrawn his name from consideration for the 2021 NBA draft. He left Mega in February 2022.

Personal life
Balcerowski's parents, Marcin and Sylwia, are former professional basketball players. His father, Marcin, played for Górnik Wałbrzych in Poland's 2- and 3-tier leagues. In 1998, at the age of 21, Marcin survived a car accident. Since then, he has used a wheelchair. Soon after, he switched to wheelchair basketball, becoming a member of Polish national team. In 2021, Marcin Balcerowski has been named the head coach of Polish wheelchair basketball national team. Sylwia is from Lublin, Poland.

National team career
Balcerowski was a member of the Poland national team that finished eighth at the 2019 FIBA Basketball World Cup. He was the youngest player at the tournament. Over eight tournament games, he averaged 2.5 points and 1.9 rebounds per game.

References

External links
 Olek Balcerowski on RealGM
 Profile at proballers.com

Living people
2000 births
ABA League players
CB Gran Canaria players
Centers (basketball)
Expatriate basketball people in Serbia
KK Mega Basket players
Liga ACB players
Polish expatriate basketball people in Spain
Polish men's basketball players